Anne Throckmorton or name in religion Anne Frances (1664 – 5 June 1734) was an English poet who was prioress of the Convent of Our Blessed Lady of Syon in Paris from 1720 to 1728.

Life
Throckmorton was born in 1664. She was one of the three daughters of Anne (born Monson) and Sir Francis Throckmorton. She had four brothers and her father was the second baronet of Coughton Court in Warwickshire and her great aunt was the prioress Margaret Throckmorton of St Monica's convent in Leuven.

She began her education English Blue Nuns in the rue de Charenton in Paris. She was there for five years before her mother joined her. Her mother had separated from her husband in 1677 and she came to spend the rest of her life with the Blue Nuns. Anne (the daughter) professed as an Augustinian nun at another convent on the outskirts of Paris on 2 July 1687. This Augustinian Convent of Our Lady of Syon had been founded by English expatriate Catholics in 1634.

She was a poet and she would create long poems as a record. In 1708 Ann Tyldesley was the prioress and Throckmorton write verses about St Paul and they were written in letters of gold to celebrate Tyldesley's golden jubilee. In that year her niece Elizabeth Throckmorton came to the convent with her six sisters to attend the convent's school.

She became the prioress of the Convent of Our Blessed Lady of Syon in Paris in 1720 and remained in that role until 1728. She banned the entry of any new novices who were with Scottish or Irish after she had difficulties with two of her nuns. In 1729 she sat for her portrait. Sir Robert Throckmorton, 4th bart, commissioned four paintings from Nicolas de Largillière. One was of his sister Elizabeth Throckmorton, another was of Anne, another of his cousin Frances Woollascot and the last was of himself.

Throckmorton died in Paris in 1734. Her niece Elizabeth Throckmorton would be elected prioress in 1736. Her portrait remained in the Throckmorton family at Coughton Court where it was placed with the portraits of her sisters. Her portrait is now owned by the National Trust and the other two paintings are abroad.

References

1664 births
1734 deaths
Nuns from Paris
Daughters of baronets